Baloskion is a genus of rush-like plants from Australia.

The genus was first formally described in 1838 by botanist Constantine Samuel Rafinesque. Species include:

Baloskion australe (R.Br.) B.G.Briggs & L.A.S.Johnson
Baloskion fimbriatum (L.A.S.Johnson & O.D.Evans) B.G.Briggs & L.A.S.Johnson
Baloskion gracile (R.Br.) B.G.Briggs & L.A.S.Johnson
Baloskion longipes (L.A.S.Johnson & O.D.Evans) B.G.Briggs & L.A.S.Johnson
Baloskion pallens (R.Br.) B.G.Briggs & L.A.S.Johnson
Baloskion stenocoleum (L.A.S.Johnson & O.D.Evans) B.G.Briggs & L.A.S.Johnson
Baloskion tenuiculme (S.T.Blake) B.G.Briggs & L.A.S.Johnson
Baloskion tetraphyllum (Labill.) B.G.Briggs & L.A.S.Johnson

References

 
Poales genera
Taxa named by Constantine Samuel Rafinesque